Fraxinus anomala is a species of ash tree known by the common name single-leaf ash. It is native to the southwestern United States and northern Mexico, where it grows in a number of habitats including desert scrub and chaparral. It is unusual in the genus in that some (though not all) specimens have simple leaves instead of the pinnate leaves more characteristic of the group.

Description
Fraxinus anomala is a deciduous shrub or small tree approaching maximum heights of five to six meters. The leaf may be simple or it may be compound, composed of up to five leaflets which look like individual leaves. Each leaflet is oval-shaped to round and may have teeth along the edges. The nondescript brownish flowers lack petals. The fruit is a flat samara up to two centimeters long and one wide, green when young and tan to brown when mature. The samaras hang in bunches.

Distribution
In Arizona, singleleaf ash is found along the Arizona transition zone of the Mogollon Rim. In northern Arizona's Grand Canyon, the range extends down the main canyons from southern and southeastern Utah, its major range area, where the Canyon Lands also show the range entering upper reaches of river basins flowing from western Colorado – Colorado and Dolores Rivers; also the shorter Yellowjacket and McElmo Rivers in Colorado's extreme southwest. In the Mojave Desert of California it is found in the sky island chaparral and woodland habitats. Minor locales also occur in southern Nevada and southern Wyoming.

References

External links
Jepson Manual Treatment - Fraxinus anomala
Ecology
Fraxinus anomala - Photo gallery

anomala
Trees of Northwestern Mexico
Trees of the Southwestern United States
Trees of the Northwestern United States
Trees of the South-Central United States
Plants described in 1871
Flora without expected TNC conservation status